In mathematics, an exact couple, due to , is a general source of spectral sequences. It is common especially in algebraic topology; for example, Serre spectral sequence can be constructed by first constructing an exact couple.

For the definition of an exact couple and the construction of a spectral sequence from it (which is immediate), see . For a basic example, see Bockstein spectral sequence. The present article covers additional materials.

Exact couple of a filtered complex
Let R be a ring, which is fixed throughout the discussion.

Each filtered chain complex of modules determines an exact couple, which in turn determines a spectral sequence, as follows. Let C be a chain complex graded by integers and suppose it is given an increasing filtration: for each integer p, there is an inclusion of complexes:

From the filtration one can form the associated graded complex:

which is doubly-graded and which is the zero-th page of the spectral sequence:

To get the first page, for each fixed p, we look at the short exact sequence of complexes:

from which we obtain a long exact sequence of homologies: (p is still fixed)

With the notation , the above reads:

The derived couple of this exact couple gives the second page and we iterate. In the end, one obtains the complexes  with the differential d:

The next lemma gives a more explicit formula for the spectral sequence; in particular, it shows the spectral sequence constructed above is the same one in more traditional direct construction, in which one uses the formula below as definition (cf. Spectral sequence#The spectral sequence of a filtered complex).

Sketch of proof: Remembering , it is easy to see:

Hence,  modulo , yielding .

We conclude: since ,

Proof: See the last section of May.

Exact couple of a double complex 
A double complex determines two exact couples; whence, the two spectral sequences, as follows. (Some authors call the two spectral sequences horizontal and vertical.) Let  be a double complex. With the notation , for each with fixed p, we have the exact sequence of cochain complexes:

Taking cohomology of it gives rise to an exact couple:

By symmetry, that is, by switching first and second indexes, one also obtains the other exact couple.

Example: Serre spectral sequence

The Serre spectral sequence arises from a fibration:

For the sake of transparency, we only consider the case when the spaces are CW complexes, F is connected and B is simply connected; the general case involves more technicality (namely, local coefficient system).

Notes

References 

.

Spectral sequences